The  Chicago Bowl  is a proposed NCAA Division I Football Bowl Subdivision college football bowl game to be played in Chicago, Illinois at Wrigley Field. The college conferences that would have tie-ins with the bowl are the Atlantic Coast Conference and the Big Ten Conference. It would be the fourth current bowl game to be played in a Baseball stadium along with the Pinstripe Bowl, Cheez-It Bowl and newly announced Fenway Bowl. It was reported that negotiations for the bowl game had been tabled for now until an agreement can be reached with the Big Ten Conference on a higher ranked team playing in the game.

References

College football bowls
Annual sporting events in the United States
American football in Illinois